Eitri is a fictional character appearing in American comic books published by Marvel Comics. Eitri is a Dwarf who lives on Svartalfheim and is the King of the Dwarves. He is a weapons forger and is notable for being the one who created Mjolnir for the Norse God Thor. Eitri has also occasionally aided the New Mutants.

Peter Dinklage portrayed the character in the Marvel Cinematic Universe film Avengers: Infinity War (2018).

Publication history
The character, created by writer Alan Zelenetz and artist Bob Hall, first appeared in Thor Annual #11 (November 1983). He continued to appear throughout the '80s in the pages of the New Mutants, starting with The New Mutants Special Edition from writer Chris Claremont and artist Arthur Adams.

Following a long absence, Eitri returned with additional details about the character in Thor vol. 2 #80 from Michael Avon Oeming, Daniel Berman and Andrea Di Vito.

Fictional character biography
Eitri ruled as king of the Dwarves of Nidavellir. In his first appearance, he along with his brother Brokk were tasked with creating a spear for Odin. Due to a young Loki's magic, the spear was cursed, and Thor was asked to have the dwarves create a new weapon. Loki once again attempted to thwart the dwarves forging, but they manage to complete the creation of Mjolnir, along with the creation of Gullinbursti (a living boar) and Draupnir (a golden armband), which they give to Odin. Years later, Loki destroys Sif's golden hair, making her bald. Thor threatens him to replace her hair and meets with Eitri and Brokk, who — due to Loki being unable to pay them — give black hair as the replacement, which Thor and Sif do not seem to mind. The loss of Sif's blonde hair is also detailed in a four-part series focusing on Loki's history.

These stories were slightly retconned, with it being explained that Eitri's creation of Mjolnir caused the extinction of dinosaurs. Eitri and his siblings, Brokk and Buri, took it upon themselves to get rid of the mold that created it so that it did not fall into the hands of Loki. Another version revealed that Mjolnir was created alongside Sif's new hair which Eitri was able to make gold. It was through Loki's own doing that Mjolnir ended up with Thor and Sif's hair became black. The story of the forging was later returned to its original version.

Odin later visits Eitri to help in forging something for him. In return, Eitri asks that Odin send a female warrior to defeat a rogue dwarf named Throgg. Sif defeats him, and Eitri happily tells her that since Throgg has been bested by a woman, he and the dwarves can now leave peacefully and proceed to begin forging the hammer Stormbreaker for Beta Ray Bill at Odin's request. Eitri is later visited by Odin and Balder who wish to stop a fight between Thor and Eric Masterson. To do this, Eitri creates Thunderstrike, a mace that evidently becomes Masterson's code name.

Eitri and his dwarves became supporting characters of the New Mutants. Due to Loki's magic, Storm and her team were transported to but separated on Asgard. Cannonball encounters Eitri in a cave and rescues Eitri's family from Throff the Terrible, but Cannonball is severely injured in the process. For this, Eitri brings him into his home and allows him to heal there, and Eitri's daughter Kindra strikes up a flirtatious relationship with Cannonball. Not long after, Eitri aids Cannonball in fending off Magma, who is possessed by Dark Elves. After helping her, Loki arrives and threatens Eitri and his kingdom. In response, he uses his magic to help Cannonball and Magma find their friends. Eitri gives Cannonball enchanted armor and a sword as well as a special hammer to give to Loki to expose him.

The New Mutants returned to Asgard due to magical influence upon one of them. The dwarves initially mistook them for spies. However, Eitri freed the team and happily greeted Cannonball and his friends. They were soon attacked by the Valkyrior who was controlled by Hela. Eitri leads his Dwarves into battle after Boom Boom insults them. Eitri is captured by Hela and forces him to forge a sword out of the uru metal by threatening the life of his daughter Kindra. He comforts her by acknowledging the New Mutants' plan of action as well as his own in which the sword has "sown the seeds of Hela's destruction". Eitri frees himself, Kindra and many of Asgard's warriors from prison and then reveals that he built a flaw in the sword. He has Kindra flee and then strikes the sword, allowing Cannonball to see the flaw and destroy it. Eitri's efforts, along with those of many other Asgardians and the New Mutants, save Odin from death.

In the stirrings of Ragnarok, Eitri traveled with his kin, Brok and Buri, to dispose of the forge that made Mjolnir itself. Such a forge, still churning with energies, might be used by Loki to create yet more weapons. The attempt ended in disaster, killing all three dwarves. The realms were later restored, putting Eitri in charge of his people yet again.

When "The War of the Realms" came and brought all realms under the threat of Malekith, Eitri went to work in the forges, needed as all dwarves were.

Powers and abilities
Eitri is an expert weaponsmith. He also has an extended lifespan.

Other versions
 Eitri appears in an issue of What If? picking up on the events of The New Mutants: Special Edition #1 and X-Men Annual #9 (1985) where the issue asks "What If the X-Men Stayed in Asgard?" After several X-Men and New Mutants decide to stay in Asgard, Sam Guthrie marries Kindra, making him Eitri's son-in-law. Afterwards when Hela makes her move against Asgard and the dwarves rally on the side of the Asgardians, Eitri is killed in battle and Sam succeeds him as king of the dwarves.
 In Infinity Wars: Iron Hammer, which amalgamates the stories of Iron Man and Thor, Eitri is a dwarf with traits similar to Ho Yinsen that wears a cursed neck shackle that makes him only create weapons for others and none for himself. He is also incapable of harming his captors the Dark Elves. Eitri eventually meets another fellow captive named Sigurd Stark and helps create a suit for him called the Iron Hammer. In an effort to help his ally escape, Eitri was killed by Krimson Kurse. Stark later buried him in the forest.

In other media

Television
 Eitri appears in The Avengers: Earth's Mightiest Heroes, voiced by John DiMaggio.
 Eitri appears in the Ultimate Spider-Man episode "Field Trip", voiced by Troy Baker.

Marvel Cinematic Universe
Eitri appears in media set in the Marvel Cinematic Universe, portrayed by Peter Dinklage. This version is depicted at a giant's size.
 First appearing in the live-action film Avengers: Infinity War, Thor, Rocket, and Groot come to Eitri for help in forging a weapon capable of killing Thanos. Eitri reveals he was forced to create the Infinity Gauntlet for Thanos in exchange for sparing the Dwarves. However, Thanos betrayed him, left him the only survivor, and smelted his hands so he could not forge anything else. Nevertheless, Thor convinces Eitri to help him forge Stormbreaker.
 An alternate timeline version of Eitri makes a cameo appearance in the Disney+ animated series What If...? episode "What If... the Watcher Broke His Oath?". This version hails from a timeline where Gamora killed Thanos and encountered Tony Stark before the pair came to Eitri to melt the Infinity Gauntlet.
 Dinklage reprised the role in the live-action film Thor: Love and Thunder, but his scene was cut.

References

External links
Eitri at the Marvel Wiki

Marvel Comics male characters
Male characters in film
Marvel Comics television characters
Fictional dwarves
Comics characters introduced in 1983
Superhero film characters